Judicial independence is the concept that the judiciary should be independent from the other  branches of government. That is, courts should not be subject to improper influence from the other branches of government or from private or partisan interests. Judicial independence is important to the idea of separation of powers.

Many countries deal with the idea of judicial independence through different means of judicial selection, or choosing judges. One way to promote judicial independence is by granting life tenure or long tenure for judges, which ideally frees them to decide cases and make rulings according to the rule of law and judicial discretion, even if those decisions are politically unpopular or opposed by powerful interests. This concept can be traced back to 18th-century England.

In some countries, the ability of the judiciary to check the legislature is enhanced by the power of judicial review. This power can be used, for example, by mandating certain action when the judiciary perceives that a branch of government is refusing to perform a constitutional duty or by declaring laws passed by the legislature unconstitutional.

Theory of evolution

Importance
Judicial independence serves as a safeguard for the rights and privileges provided by a limited constitution and prevents executive and legislative encroachment upon those rights. It serves as a foundation for the rule of law and democracy. The rule of law means that all authority and power must come from an ultimate source of law. Under an independent judicial system, the courts and its officers are free from inappropriate intervention in the judiciary's affairs. With this independence, the judiciary can safeguard people's rights and freedoms which ensure equal protection for all.

The effectiveness of the law and the respect that people have for the law and the government which enacts it is dependent upon the judiciary's independence to mete out fair decisions. Furthermore, it is a pillar of economic growth as multinational businesses and investors have confidence to invest in the economy of a nation who has a strong and stable judiciary that is independent of interference. The judiciary's role in deciding the validity of presidential and parliamentary elections also necessitates independence of the judiciary.

Disadvantages
The disadvantages of having a judiciary that is seemingly too independent include possible abuse of power by judges. Self-interest, ideological dedication and even corruption may influence the decisions of judges without any checks and balances in place to prevent this abuse of power if the judiciary is completely independent. The relationship between the judiciary and the executive is a complex series of dependencies and inter-dependencies which counter-check each other and must be carefully balanced. One can be too independent of the other. Furthermore, judicial support of the executive is not as negative as it seems as the executive is the branch of government with the greatest claim to democratic legitimacy. Roger K. Warren writes that if the judiciary and executive are constantly feuding, no government can function well.

An extremely independent judiciary would also lack judicial accountability, which is the duty of a public decision-maker to explain and justify a decision and to make amendments where a decision causes injustice or problems. Judges are not required to give an entire account of their rationale behind decisions, and are shielded against public scrutiny and protected from legal repercussions. However judicial accountability can reinforce judicial independence as it could show that judges have proper reasons and rationales for arriving at a particular decision. Warren opines that while judges are not democratically accountable to the people, the key is for judges to achieve equilibrium between accountability and independence to ensure that justice is upheld.

Economic basis
Constitutional economics studies issues such as the proper distribution of national wealth including government spending on the judiciary. In transitional and developing countries, spending on the judiciary may be controlled by the executive. This undermines the principle of judicial independence because it creates a financial dependence of the judiciary on the executive. It is important to distinguish between two methods of corruption of the judiciary: the state (through budget planning and privileges) being the most dangerous, and private. State corruption of the judiciary can impede the ability of businesses to optimally facilitate the growth and development of a market economy.

In some countries, the constitution also prohibits the legislative branch from reducing salaries of sitting judges.

Development of the concept

National and international developments

The development of judicial independence has been argued to involve a cycle of national law having an impact on international law, and international law subsequently impacting national law. This is said to occur in three phases: the first phase is characterized by the domestic development of the concept of judicial independence, the second by the spread of these concepts internationally and their implementation in international law, and the third by the implementation in national law of these newly formulated international principles of judicial independence.

A notable example illustrating this cycle is the United Kingdom. The first phase occurred in England with the original conception of judicial independence in the Act of Settlement 1701. The second phase was evident when England's concepts regarding judicial independence spread internationally, and were adopted into the domestic law of other countries; for instance, England served as the model for Montesquieu’s separation of powers doctrine, and the Founding Fathers of the US Constitution used England as their dominant model in formulating the Constitution's Article III, which is the foundation of American judicial independence. Other common law countries, including Canada, Australia, and India, also adopted the British model of judicial independence.

In recent decades the third phase of judicial independence has been evident in the UK, as it has been significantly influenced by judicial independence principles developed by international human rights constitutional documents. The European Court of Human Rights (ECtHR) has had a significant impact on the conceptual analysis of judicial independence in England and Scotland. This process began in the 1990s with the ECtHR hearing UK cases and, more significantly, in the application of the European Convention on Human Rights in British law through the Human Rights Act 1998, which came into force in the UK in 2000.

Where British national law had previously impacted the international development of judicial independence, the British Constitutional Reform Act 2005 marked a shift, with international law now impacting British domestic law. The Constitutional Reform Act dramatically reformed government control over the administration of justice in England and Wales; importantly, it discontinued the position of the Lord Chancellor, one of the country's oldest constitutional offices, who was entrusted with a combination of legislative, executive, and judicial capacities. The Lord Chancellor served as speaker of the Upper House of Parliament, the House of Lords; as a member of the executive branch and member of the senior cabinet; and as the head of the judiciary. Historically, the appellate function had a connection with the executive branch due to the types of cases typically heard – impeachment and the hearing of felony charges against peers. The Constitutional Reform Act established new lines of demarcation between the Lord Chancellor and the judiciary, transferring all the judicial functions to the judiciary and entrusting the Lord Chancellor only with what are considered administrative and executive matters. In addition, the Constitutional Reform Act replaced the Lord Chancellor by the Lord Chief Justice as head of the judiciary, separated the judicial Appellate Committee of the House of Lords from the legislative parliament, reforming it as the Supreme Court, and creating a Judicial Appointments Commission. The creation of the Supreme Court was important, for it finally separated the highest court of appeal from the House of Lords.

Thus, the United Kingdom, where judicial independence began over three hundred years ago, illustrates the interaction over time of national and international law and jurisprudence in the area of judicial independence. In this process, concepts and ideas have become enriched as they have been implemented in successive judicial and political systems, as each system has enhanced and deepened the concepts and ideas it actualized. In addition to the UK, similar developments of conceptual cross-fertilization can be seen internationally, for example in European Union law, in civil law countries such as Austria, and in other common law jurisdictions including Canada.

International standards
The International Association of Judicial Independence and World Peace produced the Mt. Scopus International Standards of Judicial Independence between 2007 and 2012. These built on the same association's New Delhi Minimum Standards on Judicial independence adopted in 1982 and their Montréal Universal Declaration on the Independence of Justice in 1983. Other influences they cite for the standards include the UN Basic Principles of Judicial Independence from 1985, the Burgh House Principles of Judicial Independence in International Law (for the international judiciary), Tokyo Law Asia Principles, Council of Europe Statements on judicial independence (particularly the Recommendation of the Committee of Ministers to Member States on the independence, efficiency and role of judges), the Bangalore Principles of Judicial Conduct 2002, and the American Bar Association's revision of its ethical standards for judges.

The justice system

In recent years, the principle of judicial independence has been described as one of the core values of the justice system.

Judicial independence metrics 
Judicial independence metrics allow a quantitative analysis of judicial independence for individual countries. One judicial independence metric is the high court independence index in the V-Dem Dataset, where higher values indicate higher independence, shown below for individual countries.

Judicial independence by country

Australia 

There was a struggle to establish judicial independence in colonial Australia, but by 1901 it was entrenched in the Australian constitution, including the separation of judicial power such that the High Court of Australia held in 2004 that all courts capable of exercising federal judicial power must be, and must appear to be, independent and impartial. Writing in 2007 Chief Justice of Australia Murray Gleeson stated that Australians largely took judicial independence for granted and the details were not matters of wide interest. No federal judge and only one supreme court judge has been removed for misconduct since 1901. Immunity from suit for judicial acts, security of tenure, and fixed remuneration are all established parts of judicial independence in Australia. The appointment of judges remains exclusively at the discretion of the executive which gives rise to concerns expressed that judicial appointments are political and made for political gain. Issues continue to arise in relation to dealing with judicial misconduct not warranting removal and incapacity of judges. In 2013 Chief Justice of NSW Tom Bathurst identified the way in which judicial and court performance was measured as one of the most substantial risks to the separation of powers in Australia.

Canada 
Canada has a level of judicial independence entrenched in its Constitution, awarding superior court justices various guarantees to independence under sections 96 to 100 of the Constitution Act, 1867. These include rights to tenure (although the Constitution has since been amended to introduce mandatory retirement at age 75) and the right to a salary determined by the Parliament of Canada (as opposed to the executive). In 1982 a measure of judicial independence was extended to inferior courts specializing in criminal law (but not civil law) by section 11 of the Canadian Charter of Rights and Freedoms, although in the 1986 case Valente v. The Queen it was found these rights are limited. They do, however, involve tenure, financial security and some administrative control.

The year 1997 saw a major shift towards judicial independence, as the Supreme Court of Canada in the Provincial Judges Reference found an unwritten constitutional norm guaranteeing judicial independence to all judges, including civil law inferior court judges. The unwritten norm is said to be implied by the preamble to the Constitution Act, 1867. Consequently, judicial compensation committees such as the Judicial Compensation and Benefits Commission now recommend judicial salaries in Canada.
There are two types of judicial independence: institutional independence and decisional independence. Institutional independence means the judicial branch is independent from the executive and legislative branches. Decisional independence is the idea that judges should be able to decide cases solely based on the law and facts, without letting the media, politics or other concerns sway their decisions, and without fearing penalty in their careers for their decisions.

Hong Kong 
In Hong Kong, independence of the judiciary has been the tradition since the territory became a British crown colony in 1842. After the 1997 transfer of sovereignty of Hong Kong to the People's Republic of China pursuant to the Sino-British Joint Declaration, an international treaty registered with the United Nations, independence of the judiciary, along with continuation of English common law, has been enshrined in the territory's constitutional document, the Basic Law.

Singapore 

Judicial independence in Singapore is protected by the Constitution of Singapore, statutes such as the State Courts Act and Supreme Court of Judicature Act, and the common law. To safeguard judicial independence, Singapore law lays down special procedures to be followed before the conduct of Supreme Court judges may be discussed in Parliament and for their removal from office for misconduct, and provides that their remuneration may not be reduced during their tenure. By statute, judicial officers of the State Courts, and the Registrar, Deputy Registrar and assistant registrars of the Supreme Court have immunity from civil suits, and are prohibited from hearing and deciding cases in which they are personally interested. The common law provides similar protections and disabilities for Supreme Court judges.

The Chief Justice and other Supreme Court judges are appointed by the President of Singapore acting on the advice of the Cabinet of Singapore. The President must consult the Chief Justice when appointing other judges, and may exercise personal discretion to refuse to make an appointment if he does not concur with the Cabinet's advice. Supreme Court justices enjoy security of tenure up to the age of 65 years, after which they cease to hold office. However, the Constitution permits such judges to be re-appointed on a term basis.

United Kingdom

England and Wales

History
During the middle ages, under the Norman monarchy of the Kingdom of England, the king and his Curia Regis held judicial power. Judicial independence began to emerge during the early modern period; more courts were created and a judicial profession grew. By the fifteenth century, the king's role in this feature of government became small. Nevertheless, kings could still influence courts and dismiss judges. The Stuart dynasty used this power frequently in order to overpower the Parliament of England. After the Stuarts were removed in the Glorious Revolution of 1688, some advocated guarding against royal manipulation of the judiciary. King William III approved the Act of Settlement 1701, which established tenure for judges unless Parliament removed them.

Contemporary usage
Under the uncodified British Constitution, there are two important conventions which help to preserve judicial independence. The first is that the Parliament of the United Kingdom does not comment on the cases which are before the court. The second is the principle of parliamentary privilege: that Members of Parliament are protected from prosecution in certain circumstances by the courts.

Furthermore, the independence of the judiciary is guaranteed by the Constitutional Reform Act 2005. In order to try to promote the independence of the judiciary, the selection process is designed to minimize political interference. The process focuses on senior members of the judiciary rather than on politicians. Part 2 of the Tribunals, Courts and Enforcement Act 2007 aims to increase diversity among the judiciary.

The pay of judges is determined by an independent pay review body. It makes recommendations to the government after taking evidence from a variety of sources. The government accepts these recommendations and will traditionally implement them fully. As long as judges hold their positions in "good order," they remain in post until they wish to retire or until they reach the mandatory retirement age of 70.

Until 1 January 2010, the legal profession was self-regulating; with responsibility for implementing and enforcing its own professional standards and disciplining its own members. The bodies which performed this function were the Bar Council and the Law Society. However, this self-regulation came to an end when approved regulators came under the regulation of the Legal Services Board, composed of non-lawyers, following the passage of the Legal Services Act 2007. This saw the establishment of the Solicitors Regulation Authority to regulate solicitors and the Bar Standards Board to regulate barristers.

United States

Federal courts
Article III of the United States Constitution establishes the federal courts as part of the federal government.

The Constitution provides that federal judges, including judges of the Supreme Court of the United States, are appointed by the President "by and with the advice and consent of the Senate." Once appointed, federal judges:

Federal judges vacate office only upon death, resignation, or impeachment and removal from office by Congress; only 13 federal judges have ever been impeached. The phrase "during good behavior" predates the Declaration of Independence. John Adams equated it with quamdiu se bene gesserint in a letter to the Boston Gazette published on 11 January 1773, a phrase that first appeared in section 3 of the Act of Settlement 1701 in England.

The President is free to appoint any person to the federal bench, yet typically he consults with the American Bar Association, whose Standing Committee on the Federal Judiciary rates each nominee "Well Qualified," "Qualified" or "Not Qualified."

State courts
State courts deal with independence of the judiciary in many ways, and several forms of judicial selection are used for both trial courts and appellate courts (including state supreme courts), varying between states and sometimes within states. In some states, judges are elected (sometime on a partisan ballot, other times on a nonpartisan one), while in others they are appointed by the governor or state legislature.

The 2000 case of Bush v. Gore, in which a majority of the Supreme Court, including some appointees of President George H. W. Bush, overruled challenges to the election of the George W. Bush then pending in the Florida Supreme Court, whose members had all been appointed by Democratic governors, is seen by many as reinforcing the need for judicial independence, both with regard to the Florida Supreme Court and the US Supreme Court. This case has increased focus and attention on judicial outcomes as opposed to the traditional focus on judicial qualifications.

See also
Judicial reform
Judiciary in Russia
Political corruption § Judiciary corruption
Rule According to Higher Law
Rule of law
Separation of powers

References

External links
Independence of the judicial system Part I. The Independence of Judges Part II - the Prosecution Service Venice Commission, 2010

Constitutional law
Accountability
Separation of powers
Philosophy of law
Sovereignty